Radical Socialist Republican Party (PRRS), sometimes shortened to Radical Socialist Party (PRS; Partido Radical Socialista), was a Spanish radical political party, created in 1929 after the split of the left-wing in Alejandro Lerroux's Radical Republican Party (PRR, created in 1908, and in decline at the time). Its main leaders were Marcelino Domingo, Álvaro de Albornoz, and Félix Gordón Ordás.

History
PRRS was an important force in the elections of 1931, winning 54 seats in the Cortes Generales that proclaimed the Second Spanish Republic on April 14. It suffered a major setback by 1933, when it only gained five seats. In the meantime, it formed part of Prime Minister Manuel Azaña's coalition between Left Republican parties and the Spanish Socialist Workers' Party (PSOE); Álvaro de Albornoz was one of the architects of the secular legislation passed by the Cortes, and also served as Justice Minister.

The party was shaken by several crises during its existence. In 1932, Juan Botella Asensi left the PRRS to found his own group (IRS, Izquierda Radical-Socialista – Radical-Socialist Left); the following year, it was split over the issue of collaboration with the PSOE: the left-wing, led by Domingo and Albornoz, argued for continued participation in government, while the right-wing of Gordón de Ordás favored an agreement with Lerroux's PRR (which they later joined). Towards the end of 1933, the leftists created the Partido Radical-Socialista Independiente (Independent Radical-Socialist Party), which fused with Acción Republicana and the Organización Republicana Gallega Autónoma to create Izquierda Republicana (April 3, 1934).

References 

Defunct liberal political parties
Political parties established in 1929
Political parties disestablished in 1934
Defunct political parties in Spain
Radical parties
Republican parties
Republican parties in Spain
Socialist parties in Spain
1929 establishments in Spain